Argyrostrotis flavistriaria, the yellow-lined chocolate moth, is a moth of the family Noctuidae. The species was first described by Jacob Hübner in 1831. It is found in the US from North Carolina south to Florida and Texas.

The larvae feed on Cyrilla racemiflora.

References

Moths described in 1831
Catocalinae
Moths of North America